The following radio stations broadcast on FM frequency 102.5 MHz:

Argentina 
 2001 in Punta Alta, Buenos Aires
 Cero in Deán Funes, Córdoba
 Continental Santa Fe in Santa Fe de la Vera Cruz, Santa Fe
 Dimensión in Coronel Bogado, Santa Fe
 Estación in San Francisco, Córdoba
 Flash in Córdoba
 Hot in Rosario, Santa Fe
 Huellas in El Chaltén, Santa Cruz
 IDEC in Rosario, Santa Fe
 La Colectiva in Buenos Aires
 La fortuna in Granadero Baigorria, Santa Fe
 La Retro in Rojas, Buenos Aires
 LRP736 Gigante in Avellaneda, Santa Fe
 LRI758 Vital in Villa Cañás, Santa Fe
 LU 100 in Santa Rosa, La Pampa (FM station)
 Mar azul in Villa Gessell, Buenos Aires
 Máster in Machagai, Chaco
 Medios del Aire in General Roca, Río Negro
 Monte in Monte Hermoso, Buenos Aires
 Nueva Era in Charata, Chaco
 O in San Carlos de Bariloche, Río Negro
 Radio María in Catriel, Río Negro
 San Cayetano in Corrientes
 Soho in Villa Carlos Paz, Córdoba
 Teen in Neuquén
 Vital in Villa Cañás, Santa Fe
 Vive in General Alvear, Buenos Aires

Australia 
 2MBS in Sydney, New South Wales
 8PNN in Darwin, Northern Territory
 ABC Northern Tasmania in Burnie, Tasmania
 2MOR in Deniliquin, New South Wales
 4MIC in Mount Isa, Queensland
 KCRFM in Perth, Western Australia
 2EEE in Bega, New South Wales
 Radio National in Gloucester, New South Wales
 Triple J in Mount Gambier, South Australia

Canada (Channel 273) 
 CBDS-FM in Pukatawagan, Manitoba
 CBKR-FM in Regina, Saskatchewan
 CBLA-FM-4 in Shelburne, Ontario
 CBRD-FM in Red Deer, Alberta
 CBTK-FM-3 in New Denver, British Columbia
 CBXH-FM in Jean D'Or, Alberta
 CBXP-FM in Grande Prairie, Alberta
 CFAT-FM in Ootsa Lake, British Columbia
 CION-FM-1 in Beauceville, Quebec
 CJFX-FM-1 in Inverness, Nova Scotia
 CJFX-FM-2 in Pleasant Bay, Nova Scotia
 CJTK-FM-3 in Elliot Lake, Ontario
 CKUA-FM-7 in Hinton, Alberta
 VF2208 in Kemano, British Columbia
 VF2295 in Onion Lake, Saskatchewan
 VOAR-12-FM in Wabush, Newfoundland and Labrador

China 
  in Beijing
 CRI News Radio in Shanghai, stopped airing in June 2020

Italy 
 RTL 102.5 in Milan

Malaysia 
 Asyik FM in Selangor and Western Pahang
 Best FM in Eastern Johor
 Fly FM in Johor Bahru, Johor and Singapore

Mexico 
 XHES-FM in Chihuahua, Chihuahua
 XHFJSC-FM in Tonalá, Chiapas
 XHHIH-FM in Ojinaga, Chihuahua
 XHIQ-FM in Ciudad Obregón, Sonora
 XHJA-FM in Xalapa, Veracruz
 XHLPS-FM in San Luis Río Colorado, Sonora
 XHMAX-FM in Los Mochis, Sinaloa
 XHMRT-FM in Tampico, Tamaulipas
 XHMVS-FM in Mexico City
 XHNPC-FM in Piedras Negras, Coahuila
 XHPINO-FM in Pinos, Zacatecas
 XHRPA-FM in Morelia, Michoacán
 XHRR-FM in Río Bravo, Tamaulipas
 XHSHT-FM in Saltillo, Coahuila
 XHUAN-FM in Tijuana, Baja California
 XHUCAH-FM in Tuxtla Gutiérrez, Chiapas
 XHUNI-FM in Ciudad Victoria, Tamaulipas
 XHUTT-FM in Villahermosa, Tabasco
 XHVTM-FM in Villa de Tamazulápam del Progreso, Oaxaca
 XHWS-FM in Culiacán, Sinaloa

Palau
T8WH-FM

Philippines
DXMM-FM in Cagayan de Oro City

Russia 

 DFM in Almetyevsk, Tatarstan
 Russian Radio in Achinsk, Krasnoyarsk border
 Europa Plus in Biysk, Altay region
 Jem FM in Yekaterinburg, Svedlovsk region
 Mayak in Kaliningrad, Kaliningrad region
 Radio Star in Kyzyl, Republic Tyva
 New Life in Magadan, Magadan region
 Radio Kontinental in Magnitogorsk, Chelyabinsk region
 Comedy Radio in Moscow, Moscow region
 Autoradio in Murmansk, Murmansk region
 Radio Dacha in Petropavlovsk-Kamchatskiy, Kamchatka border
 Silver Rain in Ryazan, Ryazan region
 NRJ in Samara, Samara region
 Radio Chanson in Sochi, Krasnodar border
 Retro FM in Surgut, Khanty-Mansiyskiy region
 Retro FM in Tomsk, Tomsk region
 Russian Radio in Tyumen, Tyumen region
 Vesti FM in Ulyanovsk, Ulyanovsk region
 Radio Chanson in Ufa, Republic Bachikiria
 Europa Plus in Cheboksary, Republic Chuvashia
 Europa Plus in Yuzhno-Sakhalinsk, Sakhalin region
 Europa Plus in Yakutsk, Republic Yakutia

Turkey 
 TRT FM in Hassa, Hatay Province

United Kingdom 
 Black Country Radio in Black Country, England
 Clyde 1 in Glasgow, Scotland
 Pulse 1 in Bradford, England
 Nova Radio North East in Newcastle upon Tyne, England
MônFm on Anglesey
Q Radio in Belfast

United States (Channel 273) 
 KACY in Arkansas City, Kansas
 KALN (FM) in Dexter, New Mexico
 KAVZ-LP in Deming, Washington
 KBBB in Bay City, Texas
  in North Fort Riley, Kansas
 KBMF-LP in Butte, Montana
 KBRQ in Hillsboro, Texas
 KCDC in Loma, Colorado
 KCHI-FM in Chillicothe, Missouri
  in Kernville, California
 KCXB-LP in West Monroe, Louisiana
 KDKE in Superior, Wisconsin
  in Salinas, California
  in Ludlow, California
  in Devils Lake, North Dakota
 KEFW-LP in Fort Worth, Texas
 KELT (FM) in Encinal, Texas
  in Saint Louis, Missouri
 KGBZ-LP in Madras, Oregon
 KGGN in Hemet, California
  in Mason, Texas
  in Casper, Wyoming
  in Fairbanks, Alaska
  in Sandpoint, Idaho
  in Los Lunas, New Mexico
  in Joplin, Missouri
 KJFI-LP in Houston, Texas
 KJHJ-LP in Conroe, Texas
  in Goodland, Kansas
  in Rozel, Kansas
  in West Plains, Missouri
 KKWB in Kelliher, Minnesota
  in Texarkana, Texas
 KLEK-LP in Jonesboro, Arkansas
 KLPM-LP in Lake Providence, Louisiana
 KMAD-FM in Whitesboro, Texas
 KMAY-LP in York, Nebraska
 KMAZ-LP in Houston, Texas
  in Lake City, Minnesota
  in Pocatello, Idaho
 KMSO in Missoula, Montana
 KNHT in Rio Dell, California
  in Phoenix, Arizona
 KNVR in Fallon, Nevada
 KOCQ-LP in Denton, Texas
 KOTN (FM) in Gould, Arkansas
 KPIA-LP in Huntsville, Texas
  in Cabot, Arkansas
  in Willmar, Minnesota
  in Gypsum, Colorado
  in Colfax, Washington
 KRER-LP in Emory, Texas
 KSFM in Woodland, California
 KSFP-LP in San Francisco, California
  in Santa Maria, California
  in Des Moines, Iowa
 KSWH-LP in Arkadelphia, Arkansas
 KTCX in Beaumont, Texas
 KTNT (FM) in Eufaula, Oklahoma
  in Loveland, Colorado
 KUAK-LP in Bismarck, North Dakota
 KUGO in Grand Canyon Village, Arizona
 KUHS-LP in Hot Springs, Arkansas
 KWAK-LP in San Xavier, Arizona
 KWOJ-LP in San Angelo, Texas
 KXAM in San Diego, Texas
 KXSF-LP in San Francisco, California
  in Lubbock, Texas
  in Seattle, Washington
  in Martin, South Dakota
  in Lexington, Mississippi
 WAJA-LP in Rocky Mount, North Carolina
 WARJ in Shawsville, Virginia
 WBAZ in Bridgehampton, New York
  in Princess Anne, Maryland
  in Hudson, Michigan
 WCMM in Gulliver, Michigan
 WCNU-LP in Bridgeton, New Jersey
 WDVE in Pittsburgh, Pennsylvania
  in Pelham, Alabama
  in Columbia, North Carolina
  in Dothan, Alabama
 WEZG-LP in Statesville, North Carolina
 WFMF in Baton Rouge, Louisiana
 WGLU in Warner Robins, Georgia
  in Fisher, Illinois
  in Sarasota, Florida
 WHVC in Rhinebeck, New York
 WIKD-LP in Daytona Beach, Florida
 WIOG in Bay City, Michigan
  in Southern Pines, North Carolina
  in Ellisville, Mississippi
  in Galva, Illinois
  in Waltham, Massachusetts
 WKXU in Hillsborough, North Carolina
  in Nicholasville, Kentucky
  in New Castle, Indiana
 WMYI in Hendersonville, North Carolina
 WNPA-LP in Canton, Ohio
  in Madison, Wisconsin
  in Marion, Virginia
 WOWF in Crossville, Tennessee
  in Orleans, Indiana
  in Summerland Key, Florida
  in Pegram, Tennessee
 WPZE in Mableton, Georgia
  in Camden, Maine
  in Reading, Pennsylvania
 WSOJ-LP in Mcminnville, Tennessee
 WTOK-FM in San Juan, Puerto Rico
 WTSS in Buffalo, New York
 WUIC-LP in Wallins Creek, Kentucky
  in Rome, New York
  in Winchester, Virginia
 WWBZ-LP in Hyden, Kentucky
 WWGW-LP in Moultrie, Georgia
 WWLG in Baltimore, Ohio
  in North Charleston, South Carolina
  in Waycross, Georgia
 WZCS-LP in Springfield, Massachusetts
  in Edgewood, Ohio

References

Lists of radio stations by frequency